The 2016 Challenger La Manche was a professional tennis tournament played on indoor hard courts. It was the 23rd edition of the tournament which was part of the 2016 ATP Challenger Tour. It took place in Cherbourg, France between 22 and 28 February.

Singles main-draw entrants

Seeds

 Rankings are as of 15 February 2016.

Other entrants
The following players received wildcards into the singles main draw:
  Grégoire Barrère
  Calvin Hemery
  Albano Olivetti
  Alexandre Sidorenko

The following player received a special exemption into the singles main draw:
  Jan Hernych

The following players received entry from the qualifying draw:
  Maxime Authom
  Sadio Doumbia
  Frederik Nielsen
  Maxime Teixeira

Champions

Singles

  Jordan Thompson def.  Adam Pavlásek 4–6, 6–4, 6–1

Doubles

 Ken Skupski /  Neal Skupski def.  Yoshihito Nishioka /  Aldin Šetkić 4–6, 6–3, [10–6]

External links
Official Website
 Combined Main Draw

Challenger La Manche
Challenger La Manche
2016 in French tennis
February 2016 sports events in France